Jean F. Eberhart (October 20, 1909 – January 3, 1976) was an American football coach. He was served as the head football coach at Southern Oregon Normal School—now known as Southern Oregon University—in Ashland, Oregon for four seasons, from 1935 until 1938, compiling a record of 3–18–3.

Head coaching record

Football

References

1909 births
1971 deaths
Southern Oregon Raiders football coaches
Southern Oregon Raiders men's basketball coaches